Phipps Garden Apartments is an apartment complex in Sunnyside Gardens, Queens, New York City. It is located on 39th Avenue between 50th and 52nd Streets, adjacent to Sunnyside Gardens Park and Sunnyside Yard. Designed by Clarence Stein, The brick buildings feature intricate brick work and curved steel fire escapes. The buildings enclose a landscaped courtyard by landscape architect Marjorie Sewell Cautley. 

A second, northern group of buildings was built between the first units and the Sunnyside Yard railroad tracks to the north in the late 1930s. Originally, there was a children's playground across the street, also designed by Cautley, but Phipps closed it by the 1990s. In 2007, the New York City Landmarks Preservation Commission designated the Phipps Garden Apartments as part of the Sunnyside Gardens Historic District.

References

Historic district contributing properties in New York City
Residential buildings in Queens, New York
National Register of Historic Places in Queens, New York